Is It Safe? is the second album from Ph.D., released in 1983. It was their last album until their 2009 comeback Three. Is It Safe? was reissued by Voiceprint Records in 2010. Drummer Simon Philips had quit the band, which now consisted solely of Jim Diamond and Tony Hymas. The album's opening track, "I Didn't Know", failed to chart in Britain but was a hit across Europe.

Certain later pressings of the album feature the band's signature song, "I Won't Let You Down", at the end of side 1, which was originally released on their eponymous debut album Ph.D..

"Fifth of May" was re-recorded for Three.

Track listing
All songs written by Jim Diamond and Tony Hymas.

Side A
 "I Didn't Know" 4:32
 "Pretty Ladies" 3:25
 "Johnny" 3:31
 "Shotgun Romance" 3:26
 "Changing Partners" 3:43

Side B
 "No Right to Be Sad" 3:59
 "Fifth of May" 5:07
 "No Happy Endings" 4:11
 "Beautiful Day" 5:09
 "New York City" 2:26

Personnel
Jim Diamond - vocals
Tony Hymas - keyboards

Additional personnel
Jeff Beck - guitar on 1 (uncredited)
Ray Russell - guitar on 7
Mark Craney - drums on 2, 4, 5, 8, 9
Simon Phillips - drums on 1, 3, 6, 7
Helen Chappelle - backing vocals
Joy Yates - backing vocals
George Handler - backing vocals
Michael Rennie - strings
Colin Fairley - mixing
Aaron Chakraverty - mastering
John Shaw - photography
Sandi Young - art direction and design
Jeffrey Levinson - executive producer
John Wolff - executive producer

External links
Ph.D. Discography

1983 albums
Ph.D. (band) albums